Walters is a surname of English origin. It used to denote "Son of Walter", derived from the given name Walter, which was introduced into England and Wales about the time of the Norman Conquest. The name "Walter" originates from the Old German wald ("rule") + heri ("warrior").

Notable people with the surname include:

 Alan Walters (1926–2009), British economist, Chief Economic Adviser to Margaret Thatcher
 Amy Walters, American television producer
 Anne-Marie Walters (1923–1998), British spy during World War II
 Arthur Melmoth Walters (1865–1941), English footballer
 Barbara Walters (1929–2022), American broadcast journalist, author, and television personality
 Bill Walters (Arkansas politician) (1943–2013), American lawyer, businessman, and politician
 Brian Walters (born 1954), Australian barrister and human rights advocate
 Bryan Walters (born 1987), American football wide receiver
 Bruce Walters (born 1954), American artist
 Bucky Walters (1909–1991), American baseball player
 Catherine Walters (1839–1920), English fashion trendsetter and courtesan
 Charles Walters (1911–1982), Hollywood director and choreographer
 Charles Walters, Jr. (1926–2009), United States economist, publisher, editor, and author
 Chester Samuel Walters (1878–1958), Canadian politician and administrator
 Cyril Walters (1905–1992), Welsh cricketer 
 Dan Walters (1966–2020), American baseball player and police officer
 David Walters (born 1951), governor of Oklahoma
 Dennis Walters (1928–2021), British politician
 Doug Walters (born 1928), Australian cricketer
 Eric Walters (born 1957), Canadian author of teenagers' literature
 Eric Walters (newsreader) (1937–2010), Australian journalist news anchor
 Frank Walters (1860–1922), Australian cricketer 
 George Walters (disambiguation), several persons
 Gordon Walters (1919–1995), New Zealand artist and graphic designer
 Guy Walters (born 1971), British author and journalist
 Harry N. Walters (1936–2019), American businessman and administrator
 Henry Walters (1848–1931), American rail magnate and art collector 
 Henry Walters (cricketer) (1917–1944), New Zealand cricketer
 Henry Walters (footballer) (1925–1994), English footballer
 Henry Walters (public servant) (1868–1929), Australian public servant
 Herbert S. Walters (1891–1973), United States senator for Tennessee
 Hugh Walters (actor) (born 1939), British actor
 Hugh Walters (author) (1910–1993), British author of children's fiction
 Hyacinth Walters (born 1926), Jamaican track and field athlete
 Ian Walters (1930–2006), English sculptor
 J. Henry Walters (1874–1952), American lawyer and state politician from New York
 James Walters (British actor), actor in the Harry Potter films
 Jamie Walters (American entertainer) (born 1969), actor, singer, firefighter and record producer
 Jason Walters (born 1985), Dutch Islamic extremist
 Joe Walters (born 1984), American lacrosse player
 John Walters (disambiguation), several persons
 Jonathan Walters (born 1983), Irish footballer
 Judith R. Walters, American neuropharmacologist
 Julie Walters (born 1950), British actress
 Kerrod Walters (born 1967), Australian rugby league player
 Kerry S. Walters (born 1954), American philosopher and Christian writer
 Kevin Walters (born 1967), Australian rugby league player
 Larry Walters (1949–1993), American balloon aviator
 Mark Walters (born 1964), English football player
 Martin Walters (born 1985), South African cricketer
 Mary Coon Walters (1922–2001), American judge
 Matt Walters (born 1979), American football player
 Max Walters (1920–2005, Stuart Max Walters), British botanist and academic
 Melanie Walters (born 1962), Welsh actress
 Melora Walters (born 1960), American actress
 Michael Walters (born 1991), Australian footballer
 Mimi Walters (born 1962), American state senator for California
 Minette Walters (born 1949), British crime writer
 Nancy Walters (1933–2009), American model, actress, and minister
 Nathaniel Walters (1875–1956),  Welsh international rugby player
 Paul Walters (1947–2006), British radio and TV producer for the BBC
 Percy Melmoth Walters (1863–1936), English footballer
 Ratus Walters, former NASCAR Cup Series team owner
 Rex Walters (born 1970), American basketball player and coach
 Riaan Walters (born 1980), Namibian cricketer
 Richard Walters, also known as Slick Rick (born 1965), English-American musician and actor
 Rita Walters (1930–2020), American politician
 Scot Walters (born 1967), American race car driver
 Shirley A. Walters (born 1948), American politician
 Shirley Walters (born 1925), Australian senator for Tasmania
 Shu-Aib Walters (born 1981), South African football player
 Sonny Walters (1924–1970), English footballer
 Stan Walters (born 1948), American football player
 Stephen Martin Walters, British actor
 Steve Walters (born 1965), Australian rugby league player
 Steve Walters (footballer) (born 1972), English footballer
 Susan Walters (born 1963), American actress
 Thorley Walters (1913–1991), English character-actor
 Tome H. Walters Jr., American military officer
 Tom Walters (association footballer) (1909–1968), Welsh footballer
 Tony Walters, Australian actor and film director
 Trevor Walters (bishop), British-born Canadian bishop of the Anglican Network in Canada
 Trevor Walters (footballer) (1916–1989), English footballer
 Trevor Walters (singer) (born 1961), British reggae singer
 Troy Walters (born 1976), American football player
 Vanessa Walters (born 1978), English novelist and playwright
 Vernon A. Walters (1917–2002), United States Army officer and diplomat
 Victor Walters, English footballer
 Wes Walters (born 1928), Australian artist
 William Thompson Walters (1820–1894), American businessman and art collector

References

See also

Walter (disambiguation)

English-language surnames
Surnames of English origin
Patronymic surnames